The grey-hooded sierra finch (Phrygilus gayi) is a species of bird in the family Thraupidae.

It is found in Argentina and Chile where its natural habitats are subtropical or tropical dry shrubland and subtropical or tropical high-altitude shrubland.

References

grey-hooded sierra finch
Birds of the Southern Andes
grey-hooded sierra finch
Taxonomy articles created by Polbot